William Larkin Stiles (September 1871 – December 5, 1908), better known as Billy Stiles or William Larkin, was an American outlaw in the Old West who, with partner Burt Alvord, led a small gang of train robbers while serving as a deputy sheriff in Arizona Territory.

Biography

Born in Casa Grande, Arizona, Stiles worked as a prospector and ranch hand in the Superstition Mountains. He later became a lawman working under Jeff Milton and John Slaughter, having a reputation as an expert tracker. Eventually meeting Willcox marshal Burt Alvord, the two formed a partnership and were very successful robbing trains in southern Arizona with "Three Fingered" Jack Dunlop, Bravo Juan Yolas, Bob Brown and brothers George and Louis Owens. Under the guise of deputy sheriffs, they were able to interfere with investigations by local authorities.

In 1899, they were apprehended attempting to rob the Southern Pacific Railroad. The two had a minor falling out over the incident with each blaming the other, and Stiles' wife also testified against him in court. Alvord soon broke him out of jail however, tying up the jailer and freeing Stiles from his cell with the keys, and the two disappeared from the area. The gang went in different directions following the February 15, 1900, shootout between five members of the gang, and lawman Jeff Davis Milton, which resulted in Dunlop being killed, and both gang member Bravo Juan Yaos and Milton being wounded. Stiles, however, is alleged to have not been present during that robbery attempt.

In 1902, Alvord and Stiles assisted the Arizona Ranger Burton C. Mossman with the capture of the Mexican bandit Augustine Chacon. After that, Stiles surrendered to Mossman and briefly served in the Arizona Rangers. The roster of Arizona Rangers shows that Stiles was thirty-two when he enlisted. He did, however, turn back to banditry soon after.

Back in Mexico, Alvord and Stiles attempted to fake their own deaths by sending two coffins with their supposed bodies to Tombstone. The ruse was quickly uncovered though and in late 1903 a group of Arizona Rangers entered Mexico to find the two bandits. While successfully capturing Alvord, Stiles was able to escape the country making his way to the Orient, spending considerable time in China and the Philippines. Stiles eventually returned, and became a deputy sheriff in Humboldt County, Nevada under the name William Larkin. On December 5, 1908, he was killed when trying to deliver a court summons. The suspect had opened fire on Stiles as he approached the suspect's barn, hitting him three times. The suspect was arrested, but for unknown reasons was acquitted during the trial.

The following appeared in the December 7, 1908, edition of the Humboldt Star:

In popular culture 

In 1955, the parts of Stiles and Alvord were portrayed by Paul Sorensen and Chris Drake, respectively, on an episode of the syndicated television series, Stories of the Century, starring and narrated by Jim Davis.

See also

Fairbank Train Robbery

References

Breakenridge, William M. Helldorado: Bringing the Law to the Mesquite. Lincoln: University of Nebraska Press, 1992. 
Eppinga, Jane. Apache Junction And the Superstition Mountains. Charleston, South Carolina: Arcadia Publishing, 2006.  
Prassel, Frank Richard. The Great American Outlaw: A Legacy of Fact and Fiction. Norman: University of Oklahoma Press, 1993.

External links

The Spell of the West: Gunfighters - William Larkin Stiles
Billy Stiles

1871 births
1908 deaths
1899 crimes in the United States
1900 crimes in the United States
1908 murders in the United States
American deputy sheriffs
American police officers killed in the line of duty
Arizona Rangers
Cowboys
Crime in Arizona Territory
Deaths by firearm in Nevada
Male murder victims
Outlaws of the American Old West
People from Casa Grande, Arizona